Roseann O'Reilly Runte, CM is president and CEO of the Canada Foundation for Innovation. Previous to that, she was a university professor and the president and vice-chancellor of Carleton University in Ottawa, Canada. She was also the seventh president of Old Dominion University in Norfolk, Virginia, only the third woman to head a four-year college or university in Virginia. She has previously served as president of Victoria University, principal of Glendon College, and president of l'Université Sainte-Anne.

Aside from her achievements in academia, she has served as President of the Canadian Commission for UNESCO and on the boards of EXPO 2000, the United Way and the Club of Rome.

Early life and education
A dual citizen of the United States and Canada, Runte earned her bachelor's degree in French from SUNY New Paltz and her master's and doctorate from the University of Kansas. Additionally, she has received honorary degrees from Acadia University, Memorial University of Newfoundland, Vasile Goldiș Western University of Arad and the West University of Timișoara.

Career
On January 7, 2008, The Globe and Mail announced that Runte would become president of Carleton University in Ottawa.

On March 24, 2017, a press release from Carleton University announced that Runte would be leaving to pursue another leadership opportunity as of July 31, 2017.

Critical acclaim and recognition
Runte's poetry has been translated into English, Chinese, Korean, Japanese and Romanian. While much of her writing is poetry, she is also noted for her works on cultural studies, with emphasis on the role of women in society.

Runte has been awarded the Order of Canada, the French Order of Merit, fellowship in the Royal Society, the Queen Elizabeth II Golden Jubilee Medal, the Palmes Académiques and a prize from the Académie française.  Runte currently sits on the board of directors of Montreal-based National Bank of Canada.

Bibliography

See also
List of Canadian university leaders

References

External links
Order of Canada citation

1948 births
Living people
Heads of universities and colleges in the United States
Old Dominion University people
State University of New York at New Paltz alumni
University of Kansas alumni
Canadian women poets
Canadian university and college chief executives
American women academics
Canadian women academics
Presidents of Carleton University
20th-century Canadian poets
American women poets
20th-century Canadian women writers
20th-century American poets
Women heads of universities and colleges
20th-century American women writers
21st-century American women
Academic staff of Glendon College